HMS Larne was an 18-gun  built for the Royal Navy during the 1820s. She was broken up in 1866.

Description
The ship's tonnage was 462  tons burthen. The Comet class was armed with a pair of 9-pounder cannon in the bow and sixteen 32-pounder carronades. The ships had a crew of 125 officers and ratings.

Construction and career

Larne, the second ship of her name to serve in the Royal Navy, was ordered with the name of Orestes on 15 May 1821, renamed Lightning on 30 January 1822, laid down in July 1828 at Pembroke Dockyard, Wales, and launched on 2 June 1829. She was completed on 16 September 1829 at Plymouth Dockyard and commissioned on 25 June 1829. The ship was again renamed as Larne on 12 September 1832.

Notes

References

1829 ships
Comet-class sloop
First Opium War ships of the United Kingdom
Ships built in Pembroke Dock